Ronald Edward Harold Andrew (born 5 January 1936) is an English former footballer who played for Port Vale and Stoke City. A centre-half, he played 137 games in an eight-year career in the Football League.

Career
Andrew played for Ellesmere Port Town before joining Stoke City in 1957. He broke into the first team in 1959–60, playing in 32 matches at centre back. At the end of what was a very poor season, manager Frank Taylor was replaced by his assistant Tony Waddington, who kept faith with Andrew. He was a regular for the "Potters" in 1960–61 and 1961–62 but lost his place once Waddington had brought in former England international Eddie Clamp in August 1962. He remained at the Victoria Ground, playing in the club's reserves, making the occasional first team appearance as and when required.

In June 1964, he joined Potteries rivals Port Vale after manager Freddie Steele paid out a £3,000 fee. He scored on his debut in a 4–1 reverse at Workington on 22 August 1964. However, he picked up a flu at the end of the month and after recovering found himself out of the first team. He never played more than two consecutive games at Vale Park, and was instead given a free transfer by new manager Jackie Mudie in April 1965.

Career statistics
Source:

Honours
Stoke City
 Football League Second Division: 1962–63

References

1936 births
Living people
People from Bebington
English footballers
Association football midfielders
Stoke City F.C. players
Port Vale F.C. players
English Football League players